Carlos Mendes Gomes (born 14 November 1998) is a professional footballer who plays for English club Fleetwood Town, on loan from Luton Town, as a winger. Born in Senegal and raised in Spain, he is a naturalised Spanish citizen.

Early life
Born in Yeumbeul, Dakar Region, to a family of Bissau-Guinean and Gambian descent, Mendes Gomes and his family moved to Spain when he was a child, after his father Carlos sought work in construction. The family moved to Lanzarote.

Career

Early career
After spending 10 years at UD Lanzarote, Mendes Gomes moved on his own to Madrid aged 15, where he began playing for Getafe. A season later he signed for Atlético Madrid's youth teams.

His family then moved to England, after his father thought it was better for the children's education, with the family relocating to Salford. Mendes Gomes could not speak any English and did not play football for a year. He then began playing for West Didsbury & Chorlton, scoring seven league goals in 50 games in all competitions during his two-season spell.

Morecambe
In May 2018, Mendes Gomes signed for Morecambe alongside Lamin Jagne, after being scouted whilst studying at The Manchester College and playing for their football academy. He made his professional debut on 14 August 2018, replacing Rhys Oates in a 3–1 EFL Cup away loss against Preston North End. He made 19 appearances for the club across the 2018–19 season, with 15 appearances coming in League Two. A one-year contract option was exercised by Morecambe at the end of the 2018–19 season.

Mendes Gomes scored his first goal for Morecambe in a 2–1 defeat at home to Oldham Athletic on 26 December 2019. He was offered a new contract at the end of the 2019–20 season.

In April 2021 he was linked with a transfer away from the club following a series of strong performances, which attracted praise from Morecambe manager Derek Adams. In May 2021 he was voted the Supporters' Player Of The Season. On 31 May 2021, he scored a 107th minute penalty in the League Two play-off Final, securing a 1–0 win against Newport County and Morecambe's first ever promotion to the third tier of English football. In June 2021 the club activated an extension to his contract. He was the club's top scorer in the 2020–21 season, with 15 goals.

Luton Town
On 26 June 2021, Mendes Gomes signed for Championship side Luton Town for an undisclosed fee. In January 2022 he assisted Luton teammate Dion Pereira secure a loan move to Bradford City, who were managed by Derek Adams, who had managed Mendes Gomes at Morecambe.

He moved on loan to Fleetwood Town in August 2022.

Career statistics

References

1998 births
Living people
Senegalese footballers
Senegalese emigrants to Spain
Spanish footballers
Getafe CF footballers
Atlético Madrid footballers
West Didsbury & Chorlton A.F.C. players
Morecambe F.C. players
Luton Town F.C. players
Association football wingers
Spanish expatriate footballers
Spanish expatriate sportspeople in England
Expatriate footballers in England
English Football League players
Naturalised citizens of Spain
People from Dakar Region
Senegalese people of Bissau-Guinean descent
Sportspeople of Bissau-Guinean descent
Senegalese people of Gambian descent
Sportspeople of Gambian descent
Spanish sportspeople of African descent
Spanish people of Bissau-Guinean descent
Spanish people of Gambian descent
Fleetwood Town F.C. players